The NME Album of the Year and Single Of The Year were announced on 23 November 2011. It was the 38th countdown of the most popular albums and tracks of the year, as chosen by music reviewers and independent journalists who work for the magazine and for NME.com.

Albums

Countries represented
 = 25
 = 18
 = 3
 = 1
 = 1
 = 1
 = 1
 = 1

Singles

Artists with multiple entries

3 Entries
Metronomy (7, 11, 41)

2 Entries
The Vaccines (14, 28)
Austra (34, 46)
Noel Gallagher's High Flying Birds (49, 50)

Countries represented
 = 27
 = 15
 = 3
 = 3
 = 2
 = 1
 = 1
 = 1

References

New Musical Express
British music-related lists
2011 in British music